2nd Half is a 2018 crime-thriller film in Kannada, directed by debutant Yogi Devegange and produced by Nagesh under the banner Brindavan Enterprises and stars Priyanka Upendra, Surabhi Santosh and Niranjan Sudhindra in the lead. The cinematography is by R K Shivakumar and music direction is handled by Chetan Sosca.

Background 
Talking about her character in 2nd Half, Priyanka Upendra was quoted saying "The movie's content is such that it talks about the khakhi profession and highlights how juniors are treated insignificantly by seniors. It becomes very difficult to make yourself ‘heard'."  While explaining her interest to be part of new age cinema, she continues "It's easy to do the tried-and tested methods. But it’s hard to take the road less taken. The same applies for films and directors. One such is Yogi Devagange, a director who is open to taking risks. Which is why I like associating with him on work. Such roles, for me as an actor, are challenging. For example, when I first heard the story of 2nd Half, I felt that it was a story that would definitely work,"

It also marks the entry of actor Upendra's nephew Niranjan into the Kannada film industry, on choosing 2nd half as a debut, he says  "Since I've grown up being interested in theatre, I've closely observed my Uncle and his acting style. I've also understood the intricacies of camera work since I associated with him in Uppi-2. Initially, I was considering entering the industry after mastering every department. I wanted to hone my skills, come in as a complete package and become a director's actor. But when 2nd Half happened, I realised that it was the right film to debut with," says Niranjan, who consulted his uncle before taking the plunge into the industry. " He felt that I shouldn't miss an opportunity that came knocking at his door. His words made me realise that it's okay to start small and scale up,"

Plot 
The story talks about the life of a woman police constable Anuradha (Priyanka Upendra) who assigned to the police CCTV control room. On her job, she gets intrigued by the life of a young girl, Saranya (Surabhi Santosh) who is a free-spirited artist. In her newfound interest in spotting this girl on CCTV, she witnesses the girl go missing one day through the CCTV which abruptly ends when the camera stops working. The rest of the story is about how she sets out on a mission to find the girl with the help of a local boy named Niru (Niranjan Sudhindra) who also happens to be Saranya's lover.

Cast 

 Priyanka Upendra as Anuradha
 Surabhi Santosh as Saranya 
 Niranjan Sudhindra as Niru
 Shalini
 Veena Sundar
 Sarath Lohitashwa
 Ritesh Gowda

Reception 
The film released on 1 June 2018 to mixed to positive reviews.

Times of India gave the film a 2/5 while stating "The film unfurls at a sluggish pace and the songs in the film feel rather forced, too"

Cinema express mentioned that "The premise of this crime plot is different enough from the rest to warrant attention. Just be warned of the slow build up." while giving it 3 on 5.

The New Indian Express reviewed that "Priyanka, on her part takes a lot of responsibility on her shoulders. Being the centre point of the film, she has gone as per the director's vision. For Niranjan, 2nd Half becomes a trial run, before he gets his next big picture. A little hardwork from his end, might help to mould his career. This is just the beginning and he has a long way to go. Surabhi Santhosh is the soul of the film with the revolving mostly around him. Even though she doesn't have much screen space, 2nd Half doesn't make for a complete picture without her." while eventually rating a 3 on 5.

References 

2018 films
Indian crime thriller films
2010s Kannada-language films